Sudanese Universities Information Network (SUIN) is the national research and education network in Sudan. In 2004, SUIN was first founded and developed under the umbrella of the Ministry of Higher Education and Scientific Research.  Since the beginning of October 2009, SUIN has been operational under the umbrella of the Association of Sudanese Universities, which is a non-governmental organization (NGO) body for all tertiary education and research institutions in Sudan. An MoU was signed between thirty universities (ASU members), with a main objective to support the establishment of SUIN as a legal independent body.

Objective 
It provides broadband connectivity among Sudanese research and educational institutions, with other NRENs in Africa and the rest of the world. Additional objectives aim to increase sharing of knowledge and collaboration for research, education and development activities.

Overall goal 

It promotes research and education networking among post-secondary education and research institutions by pooling of resources and sharing the cost of common software and e-services.

Sources

References

External links 
 Sudanese Universities Information Network (suin)

College and university associations and consortia in Africa
Internet in Sudan
National research and education networks
Universities and colleges in Sudan
2004 establishments in Africa